The Belted Range is a mountain range in Nye County, Nevada. The range is approximately 100 miles northwest of Las Vegas and midway between the Basin and Range National Monument to the northeast and the Death Valley Wilderness to the southwest.

References 

Mountain ranges of Nevada
Mountain ranges of Nye County, Nevada
Mountain ranges of the Great Basin